Durango National Forest was established in Colorado on July 1, 1911, from a portion of San Juan National Forest with . On November 21, 1920, it was re-combined with San Juan and the name was discontinued.

References

External links
Forest History Society
Forest History Society:Listing of the National Forests of the United States Text from Davis, Richard C., ed. Encyclopedia of American Forest and Conservation History. New York: Macmillan Publishing Company for the Forest History Society, 1983. Vol. II, pp. 743-788.

Former National Forests of Colorado
1911 establishments in Colorado
1920 disestablishments in Colorado